Hendren is a town in Clark County in the U.S. state of Wisconsin. The population was 499 at the 2010 census. The unincorporated communities of Tioga and Willard are located in the town.

History
Hendren was named for William T. Hendren, a member of the clergy who helped organize churches in the area.

Geography
The Town of Hendren is located in west-central Clark County.

Demographics
As of the census of 2000, there were 513 people, 197 households, and 131 families residing in the town. The population density was 14.3 people per square mile (5.5/km2). There were 247 housing units at an average density of 6.9 per square mile (2.7/km2). The racial makeup of the town was 98.64% White, 0.39% Pacific Islander, 0.97% from other races. Hispanic or Latino of any race were 1.56% of the population.

There were 197 households, out of which 29.9% had children under the age of 18 living with them, 58.4% were married couples living together, 4.6% had a female householder with no husband present, and 33.0% were non-families. 28.4% of all households were made up of individuals, and 13.7% had someone living alone who was 65 years of age or older. The average household size was 2.60 and the average family size was 3.26.

In the town, the population was spread out, with 28.3% under the age of 18, 4.7% from 18 to 24, 25.0% from 25 to 44, 23.8% from 45 to 64, and 18.3% who were 65 years of age or older. The median age was 41 years. For every 100 females, there were 112.0 males. For every 100 females age 18 and over, there were 105.6 males.

The median income for a household in the town was $27,353, and the median income for a family was $37,917. Males had a median income of $28,333 versus $20,357 for females. The per capita income for the town was $13,318. About 15.6% of families and 18.6% of the population were below the poverty line, including 28.2% of those under age 18 and 11.3% of those age 65 or over.

References

Towns in Wisconsin
Towns in Clark County, Wisconsin